The 1860 United States presidential election in Wisconsin was held on November 6, 1860 as part of the 1860 United States presidential election. State voters chose five electors to the Electoral College, who voted for president and vice president.

Wisconsin was won by the Republican Party candidate Abraham Lincoln with 57% of the popular vote, winning the state's five electoral votes.

Results

See also
 United States presidential elections in Wisconsin

References

Wisconsin
1860 Wisconsin elections
1860